Eressa javanica is a moth of the family Erebidae. It was described by Obraztsov in 1954. It is found on Java.

References

 Natural History Museum Lepidoptera generic names catalog

Eressa
Moths described in 1954